Stazzania is an extinct genus of sea snails, marine gastropod mollusks in the family Marginellidae, the margin snails.

Species
Species within the genus Stazzania include:
 † Stazzania acutapex Le Renard & van Nieulande, 1985 
 † Stazzania biconica Le Renard & van Nieulande, 1985 
 † Stazzania canaliculata Le Renard & van Nieulande, 1985
 † Stazzania crassissima Le Renard & van Nieulande, 1985 
 † Stazzania cryptoptycta Le Renard & van Nieulande, 1985 
 † Stazzania entomella (Cossmann, 1889) 
 † Stazzania fragilis (Deshayes, 1865) 
 † Stazzania fresvillensis Le Renard & van Nieulande, 1985
 † Stazzania fuscosuturata Le Renard & van Nieulande, 1985 
 † Stazzania incisa Le Renard & van Nieulande, 1985 
 † Stazzania lataperta Le Renard & van Nieulande, 1985 
 † Stazzania marginata (Michelotti, 1847) 
 † Stazzania morelletorum Gougerot & Braillon, 1968
 † Stazzania occidentalis Le Renard & van Nieulande, 1985 
 † Stazzania stenostoma (van Nieulande, 1981) 
Species brought into synonymy
 † Stazzania rhytidobasis Lozouet, 1999: synonym of † Dentimargo rhytidobasis (Lozouet, 1999) (original combination)

References

 Gougerot, L. & Braillon, J., 1968. Contribution à l'étude de la faune de gastéropodes des sables Auversiens de Barisseuse (Oise). Mémoires du Bureau de Recherches Géologiques et Minières: 175–207, sér. N° 58, part. Collequesur l'Eocène

External links
 
 Sacco, F. (1890). Catalogo paleontologico del bacino terziaro del Piemonte. Bollettino della Società Geologica Italiana. 8(3): 281-356; 9(2): 185-340
 Coovert, G. A.; Coovert, H. K. (1995). Revision of the supraspecific classification of marginelliform gastropods. The Nautilus. 109(2-3): 43-100

Marginellidae